Green Territory (Spanish:Territorio verde) is a 1952 Venezuelan drama film directed by Horacio Peterson and Ariel Severino and starring Elena Fernan, Luis Salazar and Maria Luisa Sandoval.

Cast
 Elena Fernan 
 Luis Salazar 
 Maria Luisa Sandoval 
 Tomás Henríquez as Maestro  
 Alberto de Paz y Mateos as Cura  
 Pura Vargas as La Bruja  
 Alberto Castillo Arraez as Jefe Civil  
 Miro Anton 
 Francisco Bernal as El Bobo  
 Saúl Peraza 
 Ildemaro García

References

Bibliography 
 Darlene J. Sadlier. Latin American Melodrama: Passion, Pathos, and Entertainment. University of Illinois Press, 2009.

External links 
 

1952 films
1952 drama films
Venezuelan drama films
1950s Spanish-language films
Venezuelan black-and-white films